Hector de Soubeyran de Saint-Prix (July 2, 1756 – September 2, 1828) was a French politician. He served as a member of the National Assembly from 1791 to 1792, the National Convention from 1792 to 1795, and the Council of Five Hundred from 1795 to 1799.

References

1756 births
1828 deaths
Deputies to the French National Convention
Members of the Council of Five Hundred
Members of the Legislative Assembly (France)
People from Ardèche
Regicides of Louis XVI